Satya Bandhyopadhyay was an Indian actor, known for his work in Bengali cinema. He acted in over 300 Plays, in numerous plays and performed frequently on the theatre.

He should not be confused with the other Bengali film personality by the same name who acted in films like 'Kuheli'.

Early life 
Bandyopadhyay was born on 25 September 1933 in Patna, Bihar . He studied at Lucknow Bengali school, Lucknow, Uttar Pradesh. After that, he finished his graduation from Ashutosh College which was followed by Masters in Chemistry from Science College, University of Calcutta.

Career 
Shri Satya Bandopadhyay began his career as an actor in Shri Utpal Dutt's " Little Theatre Group" — later renamed "People’s Little Theatre" — in 1952. He was a close associate of Shri Utpal Dutt, he has played leading roles in about 150 plays including important PLT productions like "Kallol", "Angar", "Neecher Mahal", "Mahavidroh" and "Titumir". From 1966 to 1967 he received training at the Berliner Ensemble in the German Democratic Republic. As a director he has directed about forty plays in Bengali and English. Shri Bandopadhyay has also acted in Bengali films, some of them directed by Shri Satyajit Ray and Shri Mrinal Sen. For his work in theatre and cinema, Shri Satya Bandopadhyay has been honoured with various prestigious awards.

His notable films include Ekdim Protidin (1980) by Mrinal Sen and Joy Baba Felunath (1979) by Satyajit Ray.

Selected filmography

Awards 
 Pashchim Banga Natya Akademi Award in 1982
 Ritwik Ghatak Award in 1989
 Sangeet Natak Akademi Award 1996
 B.F.J.A awards
  West Bengal Cine Award for his performance in “Ekdin Protidin”

References 

20th-century Bengalis
21st-century Bengalis
1933 births
20th-century Indian actors
Living people